David John Sax (born September 22, 1958) is a former Major League Baseball player and the older brother of All-Star second baseman Steve Sax. He played as a catcher for the Los Angeles Dodgers (1982–83) and Boston Red Sox (1985–87) in his brief major league career. His lone major league home run came against Jimmy Key in an important AL East matchup on September 21, 1986. It helped the eventual American League east champion Red Sox defeat their rival 3-2 in a late season game. 

Sax also played winter ball with the Navegantes del Magallanes club of the Venezuelan League in the 1983–84 season. He later made a brief appearance for the Daytona Beach Explorers of the Senior Professional Baseball Association in 1991.

Sources

External links

1958 births
Living people
Albuquerque Dukes players
Baseball players from Sacramento, California
Boston Red Sox players
Buffalo Bisons (minor league) players
Clinton Dodgers players
Columbus Clippers players
Daytona Beach Explorers players
Lethbridge Dodgers players
Lodi Dodgers players
Los Angeles Dodgers players
Major League Baseball catchers
Navegantes del Magallanes players
American expatriate baseball players in Venezuela
Pawtucket Red Sox players
San Antonio Dodgers players
Vero Beach Dodgers players